Peukert is a surname:

 Detlev Peukert (1950–1990), German historian
 Josef Peukert (1855, Albrechtsdorf an der Adler – 1910, Chicago), a Bohemian-Austrian anarchist
 Karl Peukert (1902–1962), German actor
 Leo Peukert (1885–1944), German actor
 Randolf Peukert (1929–2009), German athlete
 Wolfgang Peukert (born 1958, Karlsruhe), a German process engineer
 Wilhelm Peukert (1855–1932), German scientist

See also 
 Peucker and Peuker
 Peukert's law – relating battery capacity to discharge rate

References

German-language surnames